The 1985 Ontario municipal elections were held on November 12, 1985 to elect mayors, municipal councils, school boards, and hydro commissions in cities, towns and other incorporated communities throughout the Canadian province of Ontario.

The most closely watched contests occurred in Metropolitan Toronto.  Art Eggleton was re-elected as Mayor of Toronto, while Mel Lastman was returned as Mayor of North York.

Peter Wong was re-elected two a second term as mayor of Sudbury and Dave Neumann was re-elected to a third term as mayor of Brantford.

Brantford

Sudbury

Sudbury also held a referendum on a proposal that the city be declared a nuclear-free zone, which passed by a two-to-one margin.

Toronto

See 1985 Toronto municipal election.

Footnotes

 
1985 elections in Canada
Municipal elections in Ontario
1985 in Ontario